Robert Lynn Kammeyer (December 2, 1950 – January 27, 2003) was a professional baseball pitcher. He played parts of two seasons, 1978 and 1979, in Major League Baseball for the New York Yankees.

Kammeyer pitched in seven games for the Yankees in 1978, posting an earned run average of 5.82 with 11 strikeouts in 21.2 innings pitched. In 1979, he appeared in just one major league game, in which he gave up 8 earned runs without recording an out, a single-season record.

In 1980, he was named the Pitcher of the Year for the International League while pitching for the Columbus Clippers. Despite this, he chose to retire at the end of the season.

Kammeyer died of a pulmonary embolism in Sacramento, California on January 27, 2003.

References

External links

Major League Baseball pitchers
New York Yankees players
Oneonta Yankees players
Fort Lauderdale Yankees players
West Haven Yankees players
Syracuse Chiefs players
Hawaii Islanders players
Tacoma Yankees players
Columbus Clippers players
Baseball players from Kansas
Deaths from pulmonary embolism
1950 births
2003 deaths
Stanford Cardinal baseball players